Don't Neglect Your Wife is a 1921 American silent drama film directed by Wallace Worsley and starring Mabel Julienne Scott, Lewis Stone and Charles Clary.

Cast
 Mabel Julienne Scott as 	Madeline
 Lewis Stone as 	Langdon Masters
 Charles Clary as Dr. Howard Talbot
 Kate Lester as Mrs. Hunt McLane
 Arthur Hoyt as 	Ben Travers
 Josephine Crowell as Mrs. Abott
 Darrell Foss as 	Holt
 Norma Gordon as 	Sybyl Geary
 Richard Tucker as 	George Geary
 R.D. MacLean as 	Mr. Hunt McLane

References

Bibliography
 Connelly, Robert B. The Silents: Silent Feature Films, 1910-36, Volume 40, Issue 2. December Press, 1998.
 Munden, Kenneth White. The American Film Institute Catalog of Motion Pictures Produced in the United States, Part 1. University of California Press, 1997.

External links
 

1921 films
1921 drama films
1920s English-language films
American silent feature films
Silent American drama films
American black-and-white films
Films directed by Wallace Worsley
Goldwyn Pictures films
1920s American films